Adoring is a Chinese ensemble romantic comedy-drama film directed by Larry Yang and produced by Xu Zheng. It tells 6 heartwarming stories of how people interact with their pets to discover love in their lives. Principal photography began in April 2019 in China and it was released in China on 31 December 2019. It was subsequently released internationally in North America, Australia, New Zealand, the United Kingdom, Singapore and Japan from January 2020.

Synopsis 
Gao Ming is a single father who lives alone with a cat after being estranged from his wife and daughter, he tries to connect with the latter when she returns for a vacation. Chen Leyun is a student who becomes blind after an illness and his classmate Jiang Nan tries to help him by training her pet to be his guide-dog.  Li Xiang tries to hide his pet pig from his girlfriend Qu Feifei, but to no avail when she moves into his apartment. Zhao Le and Fang Xin is a newly married couple who finds their attempts at consummating their marriage being hilariously thwarted repeatedly by her pet dog. Luo Hua gets his neighbour An Ying's help to get care of a stray cat, not knowing her obsession with cleanliness. Ah De has the help of a stray dog when he loses his way delivering food to the apartment, and ends up helping it to find a new home eventually.

Cast

Main cast
 Yu Hewei as Gao Ming, a single father
 Li Landi as Gao Mengmeng, Gao Ming's daughter
 Leo Wu as Chen Leyun, a blind student
 Zhang Zifeng as Jiang Nan, Leyun's classmate
 Wallace Chung as Li Xiang, a stock broker
 Yang Zishan as Qu Feifei, Li Xiang's girlfriend
 William Chan as Zhao Le, a graphic designer
 Zhong Chuxi as Fang Xin, an air stewardess, Zhao Le's wife
 Tan Jianci as Luo Hua, an animal lover
 Kan Qingzi as An Ying, Luo Hua's neighbour
 Guo Qilin as Ah De, a food-delivery worker

Supporting cast
 Gong Beibi as Gao's Ex-wife
 Zhao Yunzhuo as young Fang Xin
 Li Qian
 Lang Yueting
 Yu Ailei
 Wang Ziyi
 ONER

Soundtrack

Awards and nominations

References

External links 
 

2019 films
Chinese romantic comedy-drama films
Films directed by Larry Yang
2010s Mandarin-language films